John Morley (1838 – 1923), was a British Liberal statesman, writer and newspaper editor. 

John Morley may also refer to:

Politicians
 John Morley (15th century MP) for Lancashire
 John Morley (died 1565), MP for Lewes
 John Morley (died 1587), English MP for Wycombe and St Ives
 Sir John Morley (died 1622) (1572–1622), English MP for New Shoreham and Chichester
 John Morley (Vermont politician) (born 1970)

Sportspeople
 John Morley (cricketer) (1838–1864), English cricketer
 John Morley (Gaelic footballer) (1942–1980)
 John Morley (rugby league) (fl. 1900s)
 Jack Morley (1909–1972), Welsh rugby player

Others
 John David Morley (1948–2018), English writer

See also
 John Parker, 1st Earl of Morley (1772–1840)
 John Parker, 6th Earl of Morley (1923–2015)